Krasnaya Regizla (Qıźıl Irğıźlı) is a rural locality (a village) in Arkh-Latyshsky Selsoviet, Arkhangelsky District, Bashkortostan, Russia. The population was 66 as of 2010. There are 8 streets.

Geography 
Krasnaya Regizla is located 14 km southeast of Arkhangelskoye (the district's administrative centre) by road. Gorny is the nearest rural locality.

References 

Rural localities in Arkhangelsky District